IUCN category, where "IUCN" refers to the International Union for Conservation of Nature, may refer to:

 IUCN protected area categories used to classify protected areas.
 IUCN Red List categories used to classify the state or threat to species' extinction.